Alex Payne (born June, 1980) is a television presenter and broadcaster in the UK.

Early life and education 
Payne attended Sandroyd School, Eton College and Edinburgh University.

Career 
Until 2018 he spent much of his career presenting live coverage of rugby union on Sky Sports, where he also hosted the Rugby Club. Payne was one of the youngest presenters on the channel when he started, and became the lead presenter of their coverage of English and European Rugby, and hosted coverage of England's Internationals.

He now hosts the podcast 'The Good, The Bad & The Rugby', which debuted at no.1 in the Apple charts before releasing its first episode.

Personal life 
Payne is married with two children, the eldest of which was born prematurely at 29 weeks into pregnancy.

References 

Sports TV Guide, Listings, Schedule, Programme | Sky Sports
Alex Payne • Biography & Images

Sky Sports presenters and reporters
Living people
People educated at Sandroyd School
Alumni of the University of Edinburgh
1980 births